Tibú Airport  is an airport serving Tibú, a town and municipality in the Norte de Santander Department of Colombia. The runway is on the southern edge of the town.

Airlines and destinations

See also

Transport in Colombia
List of airports in Colombia

References

External links
OpenStreetMap - Tibú
OurAirports - Tibú
SkyVector - Tibú
Tibú Airport
Google Maps - Tibú

Airports in Colombia